KPBL (1240 AM, Lakes Area Country Radio) was a radio station broadcasting a country music format. Licensed to Hemphill, Texas, United States, the station served the Lufkin-Nacogdoches area.  The station was owned by Philburr.

The station's license expired on August 1, 2013, due to the station failing to file an application for renewal.

References

External links

PBL
Radio stations established in 1983
Defunct radio stations in the United States
Radio stations disestablished in 2013
1983 establishments in Texas
2013 disestablishments in Texas
PBL